Elections to the City of Melbourne were held via postal ballot in October 2008 to elect 7 councillors to the council, as well as the direct election of the Lord Mayor and Deputy Lord Mayor of Melbourne. Incumbent Lord Mayor John So did not seek re-election, and was succeeded by former Victorian Opposition Leader and Liberal Party leader Robert Doyle.

Results

Mayoral election

Councillor election

References

Mayoral elections in Melbourne
2008 elections in Australia
2000s in Melbourne
October 2008 events in Australia